Trapper Keeper is a brand of loose-leaf binder created by Mead. Popular with students in the United States and parts of Latin America from the 1970s to the 1990s, it featured sliding plastic rings (instead of standard snap-closed metal binder rings), folders, and pockets to keep schoolwork and papers, and a wrap-around flap with a Velcro closure (originally a metal snap closure).

Trapper Keepers usually had a theme, such as a cartoon, television show, or video game. Between 1988 and 1995, "Designer Series" Trapper Keepers featured abstract designs and, later, computer-generated images.

Design history
The Trapper Keeper was invented in the late 1970s by E. Bryant Crutchfield, Director of New Ventures at the Mead Corporation. The binder got its name because it was sold in combination with pocket folders designed by Mead called "Trappers", which differed from other pocket folders in that the pockets' three sides connected with the bottom, outside edge, and top (as opposed to the bottom, outside edge, and spine) of the folders. This design prevented papers from falling out of the Trapper's pockets when it was closed. Trappers were three-hole punched so that they could be put in any 3-ring binder, including a Trapper Keeper. In August 1978, the Trapper Keeper was tested in Wichita, Kansas, and to the surprise of Crutchfield, it completely sold out.

Three years after the Trapper Keeper was released, the design was tweaked to include a Velcro strap instead of the initial metal buckle. This design change allowed for greater ease of use and more efficient manufacturing.

The Designer Series ran from 1988 to 1995, and introduced "fashionable, funky and sometimes psychedelic designs... The company also made a deal with Lisa Frank... and licensed cartoon characters like Garfield and Sonic the Hedgehog."

From 1996 to 1999, Mead released a collection of notebooks and folders known as "FuturoCity", featuring futuristic city and landscape designs.

In 2007, a new version of Trapper Keeper featured a magnetic closure in place of the Velcro closure, a customizable front cover, and binder dividers instead of Trapper folders.

In 2014, another new version of the Trapper Keeper was released, featuring a metal button closure, as well as a new feature called "Snapper Trappers", which are plastic strips that act as dividers and they can have regular notebooks attached to them in addition to folders and dividers; the Snapper Trappers can be placed or removed without having to open the rings of the binder.

For the 2015 school year, Trapper Keeper introduced Star Wars Trapper Keeper supplies, Hello Kitty Trapper Keeper supplies, and a new patterned line called Fun In The Sun.

Mead brought back the original design for the Trapper Keeper with most of its original features in 2021.

See also 

 Pee Chee folder

References

External links 
 Vintage Trapper Keeper gallery

Products introduced in 1978
1980s fads and trends
American brands
Stationery
Personal information managers